A (figurative) peon (reflecting the former institution of peonage and modern analogs of it) is a person with little authority, often assigned unskilled tasks, or an underling or any person subjected to capricious or unreasonable oversight. In this sense, peon is often used in either a derogatory or self-effacing context.
 American English: in a historical and legal sense, peon generally referred to someone working in an unfree labor system (known as peonage).  The word often implied debt bondage and/or indentured servitude.

There are other usages in contemporary cultures:
 English language varieties spoken in South Asian countries: a peon is an office boy, an attendant, or an orderly, a person kept around for odd jobs (and, historically, a policeman or foot soldier). (In an unrelated South Asian sense, "peon" may also be an alternative spelling for the poon tree (genus Calophyllum) or its wood, especially when used in boat-building.)
 Shanghai: among native Chinese working in firms where English is spoken, the word has been phonetically reinterpreted as "pee-on" (referencing the purported figurative origin of the term ), and refers to a worker with little authority, who suffers indignities from superiors.
 Computing slang: a peon is an "unprivileged user"—a person without special privileges on a computer system (compare luser) The other extreme is "superuser" (compare systems administrator).
 Financial trading slang: a peon is a market participant who trades in small quantities or a small account.

References

English-language slang
Pejorative terms for people